The Edinburgh Wolves are an American football team based in Edinburgh, Scotland, that competes in the BAFA National Leagues Premier Division North, the highest level of British American Football. The team operate from the Peffermill Playing Fields.

History

Edinburgh has had an American Football team since the Edinburgh Eagles were formed in 1985. Playing until 1988, they achieved success, becoming the Borders Conference champions in 1987. They subsequently merged with the ‘Capital Clansman’ team in 1989 to form the Edinburgh Phoenix who posted a 22–17 record in the British leagues over the next four years. A different Eagles team played in 1993 and 1994 before the Lothian Raiders played in Saughton and Dalkeith from 1996 until 1998. Edinburgh was without a senior amateur team between 1998 and 2003, although the Scottish Claymores played in the city at Murrayfield until 2002.

The Edinburgh Wolves were originally formed in 2002 by a group of eight people who had previously played Flag Football. The Wolves name was adapted from the flag team which was absorbed into the organisation at the same time.
The club quickly expanded and was accepted into the British Senior League in November 2002. The League was rebranded to the British American Football League (BAFL) in 2005. The club moved to the BAFA Community League in 2010 after BAFL went into administration. The Wolves competed in the 2003, 2004 and 2005 seasons of the BAFL under Head Coach Peter Laird. They competed in the BSL in 2003 and finished with a 3–7–0 in Division Two in their first season. One of the team's players, Jeff Nicholson, went on to play for the Scottish Claymores in 2003 and 2004.They finished third in the competitive Division Two Scottish Conference in 2004. In 2005, their RB David "Magic" Molloy broke the 1,000-yard rushing mark.

Laird retired as Head Coach at the end of the 2005 season and David Molloy took over the position for the 2006 season. However, due to lack of Lineman, the team had to pull out of the league, and Molloy consequently resigned. At this time a large number of players left to join other clubs in Scotland rather than take a year out with the Wolves to return in the future.
While the club did not take part in competitive games in 2006 they still played three games, including their first match at Meadowbank Stadium – the 3 wins in 2006 under newly appointed and current Head Coach Don Edmonston propelled the club back into BAFL in 2007. The success of the 2006 match at Meadowbank Stadium allowed the Wolves to move their home fixtures to the venue for the 2007 season. They are currently the only team in Scotland to play in a stadium. In their second season since re-entering the league, the team finished with a 5–5 record, their best ever. They won 4 of their home games at Meadowbank and a tough away game at Chester. The team also had two players win BAFL player of the week, with Allan Price in week 13 gaining 157 yards and two touchdowns and Graeme Kellington in week 15 picking off two interceptions and running them back for touchdowns. Campbell Lewis, Paul Elder, and Jim Scott also picked up nominations in weeks 4, 6 and 10 respectively.

The team had their best ever result and first winning season, going 6–4 and only losing twice to Glasgow and twice to Manchester. They narrowly missed out on the playoffs. The Wolves again showed their ongoing development by having their best season to date, compiling an 8–2 record and being knocked out of the playoffs 6–0 by the Shropshire Revolution. After their success in 2010, the Wolves were offered a promotion to Division 1, however, they declined this. They went on have a poor season, finishing 5–5, justifying their decision to stay in Division 2.

The Wolves bounced back well from a disappointing 2011 season after recruiting new players also coaches to post their best record to date, winning eight games, as well as a draw and a loss, both at the hands of the Clyde Valley Blackhawks.

The Wolves entered the 2019 season after some off-season announcements. These announcements included the appointment of Ross Templeton (Great Britain Lions Linebackers coach) as defensive coordinator, announcement of new sponsors in the form of  Lamborghini Edinburgh and Sharkey and the debut of their brand new uniforms (moving from the traditional red uniforms to wolf grey). The Edinburgh Wolves announced the departure of two key starters on offence as they progressed to semi-pro careers in Europe. Starting quarterback Jamie Morrison joined the Prague Mustangs in the Czech Republic and starting running back Calum Davidson joined the Cottbus Crayfish in German Football League 2. The 2019 season concluded with the Edinburgh Wolves finishing 3-7 (wins-losses) and the Wolves narrowly securing another year in the top division of British football.

Junior and Youth Programme
The Edinburgh Wolves Youth Program was founded in 2005 for both Junior (16–19-year-olds) and Youth (14–16-year-olds). The Junior team folded after the 2015 season but the Youth team compete in the Scottish Conference.

University Programme
In November 2003, the Wolves launched a university team who were accepted into the Collegiate league in the UK (BUAFL) for the 2004–05 season. In 2005 the team were rebranded as the Timberwolves and became a stand-alone organisation, independent but affiliated to the Wolves. In 2007, the Timberwolves were rebranded again to the Napier Mavericks and when league rules changed and teams had to represent a single educational institution, the Mavericks split and became the University of Edinburgh Predators and the Edinburgh Napier Knights. These teams are no longer affiliated to the Wolves. In 2014, the Wolves took over the coaching and management of the new university team at Heriot-Watt. In 2015, Heriot-Watt American Football was accepted into the sports union and will compete in the 2015 BAFUL North league.

Sponsorship and Recruitment
The Wolves are a non-profit organisation and no members of the staff or players receive payments and are all volunteers. As with many teams in the United Kingdom, all of the Wolves Players are amateur and are expected to make financial contributions to ensure the team continues. The Club does seek sponsorship for home games to lift the financial burden on players & Staff.
The three teams have a continuous recruitment policy and new players have been encouraged to join the club all year round.
The club also offers training to non-players/volunteers and have a game day staff crew which also recruits year round.

Staff
In 2007 and 2009 the Wolves management team were awarded the John Slavin Award for the best Game Day Management in the whole BAFL league.

The Adult team Head Coach is Victor Paredo.

Team Roster

Season by Season Record

References

External links
Official site

BAFA National League teams
Sports teams in Edinburgh
American football teams in Scotland
2002 establishments in Scotland
American football teams established in 2002